() is a female given name of Persian origin, meaning "rare; unique; precious".

References

Persian given names